The 1949 West Texas State Buffaloes football team was an American football team that represented West Texas State College (now known as West Texas A&M University) in the Border Conference during the 1949 college football season. In its third season under head coach Frank Kimbrough, the team compiled a 5–4 record (3–2 against conference opponents) and outscored opponents by a total of 249 to 170.

Schedule

References

West Texas State
West Texas A&M Buffaloes football seasons
West Texas State Buffaloes football